Portuguese orthography is based on the Latin alphabet and makes use of the acute accent, the circumflex accent, the grave accent, the tilde, and the cedilla to denote stress, vowel height, nasalization, and other sound changes. The diaeresis was abolished by the last Orthography Agreement. Accented letters and digraphs are not counted as separate characters for collation purposes.

The spelling of Portuguese is largely phonemic, but some phonemes can be spelled in more than one way. In ambiguous cases, the correct spelling is determined through a combination of etymology with morphology and tradition; so there is not a perfect one-to-one correspondence between sounds and letters or digraphs. Knowing the main inflectional paradigms of Portuguese and being acquainted with the orthography of other Western European languages can be helpful.

A full list of sounds, diphthongs, and their main spellings is given at Portuguese phonology. This article addresses the less trivial details of the spelling of Portuguese as well as other issues of orthography, such as accentuation.

Letter names and pronunciations
Only the most frequent sounds appear below since a listing of all cases and exceptions would become cumbersome. Portuguese is a pluricentric language, and pronunciation of some of the letters differs. Apart from those variations, the pronunciation of most consonants is fairly straightforward. Only the consonants r, s, x, z, the digraphs ch, lh, nh, rr, and the vowels may require special attention from English speakers.

Although many letters have more than one pronunciation, their phonetic value is often predictable from their position within a word; that is normally the case for the consonants (except x). Since only five letters are available to write the fourteen vowel sounds of Portuguese, vowels have a more complex orthography, but even then, pronunciation is somewhat predictable. Knowing the main inflectional paradigms of Portuguese can help.

In the following table and in the remainder of this article, the phrase "at the end of a syllable" can be understood as "before a consonant, or at the end of a word". For the letter r, "at the start of a syllable (not between vowels)" means "at the beginning of a word or after l, n, s, or a prefix ending in a consonant".  For letters with more than one common pronunciation, their most common phonetic values are given on the left side of the semicolon; sounds after it occur only in a limited number of positions within a word. Sounds separated by "~" are allophones or dialectal variants.

The names of the letters are masculine.

{| class="wikitable"
! rowspan=2 | Letter
! colspan=2 | European
! colspan=2 | Brazilian
! rowspan=2 | Phonemic  values
! rowspan="2" |Example
! rowspan="2" |Example (IPA)
|-
! Name
! Name (IPA)
! Name
! Name (IPA)
|-
| align=center| Aa || á ||   || á ||   || , 
|cara
|[ˈkaɾɐ]
|-
| align=center|  Bb || bê ||  || bê ||  ||  or  
|bato|[ˈbatu(~ʊ)]
|-
| align=center|  Cc || cê ||   || cê ||   ||  ;  
|conciso
|[kõˈsi.zu(~ʊ)]
|-
| align=center|  Dd || dê ||   || dê ||   ||  ~   or  
|dádiva
|[ˈdaðivɐ/ˈdad(ʒ)ivɐ]
|-
|rente
|[ˈʀẽntə/ˈʁẽt(ʃ)i]
|-
| align=center|  Ff || efe ||  || efe ||  ||  
|fala
|[ˈfa(~ɑ)lɐ]
|-
|ɡiɡante
|[ʒiˈɣɐ̃ntə/ʒiˈɡɐ̃t(ʃ)i]
|-
| align=center|  Hh || agá ||  || agá ||  || natively silent,  in loanwords 
|homem
|[ˈɔmɐ̃j/ˈõmẽj~ˈomẽ(ɲ)]
|-
| align=center|  Ii  || i ||  || i ||  ||  
|idade
|[iˈðaðə/iˈdad(ʒ)i]
|-
| align=center|  Jj   || jota ||  || jota ||  ||  
|janta
|[ˈʒɐ̃(n)tɐ]
|-
| align=center|Kk
|cápa|/ˈkapɐ/
|cá|/ˈka/
|/k/
|kiwi
|[ki:wi]
|-
| align=center|  Ll  || ele ||  || ele ||  ||  ~   
|lamaçal
|[lɐmɐˈsa(~ɑ)ɫ/lamaˈsaw]
|-
| align=center|  Mm  || eme ||  || eme ||  ||   
|mala
|[ˈma(~ɑ)lɐ]
|-
| align=center|  Nn  || ene ||  || ene ||  ||   
|ninho
|[ˈniɲʊ], [ˈnĩj̃u]
|-
|óculos
|[ˈɔkulu(~ʊ)s(/ʃ)]
|-
| align=center|  Pp  || pê ||  || pê ||  || 
|pato
|[ˈpatu(~ʊ)]
|-
| align=center|  Qq  || quê ||  || quê ||  ||  
|quente
|[ˈkẽntə/ˈkẽt͡ʃi]
|-
|raro
|[ˈʁ/ʀ/raɾu], [ˈhaɾu(~ʊ)]
|-
|siso
|[ˈsizu(~ʊ)]
|-
| align=center|  Tt  || tê ||  || tê ||  ||  ~   or  
|tente
|[ˈtẽntə/ˈtẽt͡ʃi]
|-
| align=center|  Uu  || u ||  || u ||  ||  
|urubu
|[uɾuˈbu] ([uɾuˈβu])
|-
| align=center|  Vv  || vê ||  || vê ||  ||  or  
|vaca
|[ˈvakɐ] ([ˈbakɐ])
|-
| align=center|Ww
|dâblio or duplo vê|/ˈdɐbliu/, 
/ˈdupluˌve/
|dáblio|/ˈdabliu/
|/u/, /v/ or /w/
|watt
|[ˈwa:tt]
|-
|xale
|[ˈʃa(~ɑ)lə/ˈʃali]
|-
| align=center|Yy
|ípsilon or i grego|/ˈipsɨlɔn/, /ˌi ˈgrɛgu/
|ípsilon|/ˈipsilõ/
|/i/ or /j/
|yeti
|[yeti:]
|-
|zunir
|[zuˈniɾ̥(ə)/zũ.ˈ(n)iɾ~∅]
|}

Notes
In Mozambique an intervocalic /d/ can be realized as [d.ð] or [dː], mostly before a final e-caduc or reduced /o/. In other intervocalic schemes can be realized also as [ð] of European variety.
 /k/ can be realized in Mozambique as [kʰ], mostly before a final e-caduc or reduced /o/.
 Before the letters e, i, y, or with the cedilla.
 Allophonically affricated before the sound  (spelled i, or sometimes e), in BP.
 May become an approximant as a form of vowel reduction when unstressed before or after another vowel.
 The letters f, j, l, m, n, r and s are sometimes named differently in the northwest region of Brazil: fê, ji, lê, mê, nê, rê, sê.
 Silent at the start or at the end of a word. Also part of the digraphs ch, lh, nh. See below.
 The letters K (called capa /ˈkapɐ/ in EP or cá /ka/ in BP), W (EP: dâblio /ˈdɐbliu/ or duplo vê /ˈduplu ˌve/, BP: dáblio /ˈdabliu/), and Y (EP: ípsilon /ˈipsɨlɔn/ or i grego /ˌi ˈgrɛgu/, BP: ípsilon /ˈipsilõ/) were not part of the official alphabet before 2009. Used only in foreign words, personal names, and hybrid words derived from them. The letters K, W and Y will be included in the alphabet used in East Timor, Macau, Angola, Mozambique, Guinea-Bissau, and São Tomé and Príncipe, when the 1990 Portuguese Language Orthographic Agreement comes into legal effect. In Brazil, the Orthographic Agreement went into legal effect from January 1, 2009; in Portugal, from May 13, 2009; in Cabo Verde, from October 1, 2009. However, those letters were used before 1911 (see the article on spelling reform in Portugal).
 Usually silent or voiceless at the end of syllables (word-final n is fully pronounced by some speakers in a few loaned words). See Nasalization section, below.
 At the start of syllables (not between vowels) in most of the dialects or at the end of syllables (in some dialects of BP), a single graphical r is pronounced  or ~~ (see Portuguese phonology for variants of this sound). However, in the dialect of São Paulo it can be realized as /ɽ/ even in consonant clusters, such as [bɽ], [dɽ], [fɽ], [gɽ], [kɽ], [pɽ], [tɽ], or after /j/. After /l/ can be assimiled and realized as [ɽ.r], e.g. melro [mˈɛɽ.rʊ]. In European dialects word-initial or preceded by /n/, /l/, /s/ ([ʒ]) or nasalisation can be pronounced as very intense /ʁ/, /ʀ/, or /r/ (latter — as in Galician). Word-final rhotics may also be silent when the last syllable is stressed, in casual and vernacular speech, especially in Brazil (pervasive nationwide, though not in educated and some colloquial registers) and in some African and Asian countries. In European variety a word-initial /r/ can be realised as [r̝] after /s/. Word(or coda)-final European variants of /ɾ/ include [ɾ̥], [r̝], [r̻], and [ɻ̊]. Sometimes a non-phonematic [ə] is added after a final /ɾ/.
 A single s is pronounced voiced  between vowels.
 Letter t, surrounded by nasal vowels (realized always as nasal vowel +  before it), and stops, can be read as allophonic  in some Mozambican varieties. Mostly before final reduced vowels can be realized there also as [tʰ]. The same pattern of aspiration for /t/ occurs in East Timorese Portuguese.
 Northern Portuguese dialects share with Galician and other, more distantly related, North Iberian languages (Astur-Leonese, including Mirandese, Castilian, Aragonese, Catalan and, to some extent, Basque) one common feature — merger of /b/ and /v/ into /β~b/.
It is always pronounced  at the beginning of words.

Digraphs
Portuguese uses digraphs, pairs of letters which represent a single sound different from the sum of their components. Digraphs are not included in the alphabet.

{| class="wikitable" style="font-size:120%"
! style="font-size:80%" | Grapheme
! style="font-size:80%" | Pronunciation
|- align=center
| ch || //
|- align=center
| lh || //, /lʲ/, /lj/
|- align=center
| nh || //, //
|- align=center
| rr || //
|- align=center
| ss || //
|- align=center
| qu || //; //
|- align=center
| gu || //; //; /ɡu/
|}

The digraphs qu and gu, before e and i, may represent both plain or labialised sounds (quebra , cinquenta , guerra , sagui ), but they are always labialised before a and o (quase, quociente, guaraná). The trema used to be employed to explicitly indicate labialized sounds before e and i (quebra vs. cinqüenta), but since its elimination, such words have to be memorised. Pronunciation divergences mean some of these words may be spelled differently (quatorze / catorze and quotidiano / cotidiano). The digraph ch is pronounced as an English sh by the overwhelming majority of speakers. The digraphs lh and nh, of Occitan origin, denote palatal consonants that do not exist in English. The digraphs rr and ss are used only between vowels. The pronunciation of the digraph rr varies with dialect (see the note on the phoneme , above).

Diacritics
Portuguese makes use of five diacritics: the cedilla (ç), acute accent (á, é, í, ó, ú), circumflex accent (â, ê, ô), tilde (ã, õ), and grave accent (à, rarely ò, formerly also è, ì, and ù). Formerly the diaeresis was also used (ï, ü).

{| class="wikitable" style="font-size:120%"
! style="font-size:80%" | Grapheme
! style="font-size:80%" | Pronunciation
|- align=center
|  á
| 
|- align=center
| â
| 
|- align=center
| ã
| 
|- align=center
| à
| 
|- align=center
| ç 
| 
|- align=center
| é
| 
|- align=center
| ê
| 
|- align=center
| í
| 
|- align=center
| ó
| 
|- align=center
| ô
| 
|- align=center
| õ
| 
|- align=center
| ú
| 
|- align=center
|}

The cedilla indicates that ç is pronounced  (from a historic palatalization). By convention, s is written instead of etymological ç at the beginning of words, as in "São", the hypocoristic form of the female name "Conceição".

The acute accent and the circumflex accent indicate that a vowel is stressed and the quality of the accented vowel and, more precisely, its height: á, é, and ó are low vowels (except in nasal vowels); â, ê, and ô are high vowels. They also distinguish a few homographs: por "by" with pôr "to put", pode "[he/she/it] can" with pôde "[he/she/it] could".

The tilde marks nasal vowels before glides such as in cãibra and nação, at the end of words, before final -s, and in some compounds: romãzeira "pomegranate tree", from romã "pomegranate", and vãmente "vainly", from vã "vain". It usually coincides with the stressed vowel unless there is an acute or circumflex accent elsewhere in the word or if the word is compound: órgão "organ", irmã + -zinha ("sister" + diminutive suffix) = irmãzinha "little sister". The form õ is used only in the plurals of nouns ending in -ão (nação → nações) and in the second person singular and third person forms of the verb pôr in the present tense (pões, põe, põem).

The grave accent marks the contraction of two consecutive vowels in adjacent words (crasis), normally the preposition a and an article or a demonstrative pronoun: a + aquela = àquela "at that", a + a = à "at the". It can also be used when indicating time: "às 4 horas" = "at 4 o'clock". It does not indicate stress.

Sometimes à and ò are used in other contraction forms, e.g.: cò(s) and cà(s) (from the comparative conjunction ‘than’ and definite articles o and a). (Although, these examples are rare and tend to be called unstandard or dialectal, as well as co(s) and coa/ca(s) from ‘with’ + definite articles). Other examples of its use are: prà, pràs (from para+a/as) and prò, pròs (from para+o/os). According to the orthographic rules of 1990 (adopted only in Portugal, Brazil, and Cabo Verde in 2009), these forms should be spelled without the grave accent. acento grave na contracção cò (Ortografia / Acordo ortográfico). FLiP. Dúvida linguística/
 
Some grammatists also used to denote unstressed [ɛ] and [ɔ] as è and ò respectively. This accentuation is not provided by the current orthographical standards.

Until the spelling reforms of 1971 (Brazil) and 1973 (Portugal), the grave accent was also used to denote accents in words with so-called irregular stress after some changes. E.g., in adverbs formed with -mente affix, as well as in some other cases of indication of slightly accented or yet unaccented vowels (mostly because of affixal word formation), all of the vowels can take the grave accent mark, e.g.: provàvelmente, genèricamente, analìticamente, pròpriamente, ùnicamente. The main pattern is to change the acute accent mark, if it graphically exists in any part of the word before the affixation to the grave one, e.g.: in penultimate syllable: notável › notàvelmente; in ultimate syllable: jacaré › jacarèzinho, and so on. The circumflex accent mark did not change: simultâneo/a › simultâneamente.

The graphemes â, ê, ô and é typically represent oral vowels, but before m or n followed by another consonant (or word final -m in the case of ê and é), the vowels represented are nasal. Elsewhere, nasal vowels are indicated with a tilde (ã, õ).

The letters with diaeresis are nowadays practically in disuse. Until 2009 they were still used in Brazilian Portuguese in the combinations güe/qüe and güi/qüi (European Portuguese in this case used the grave accent between 1911 and 1945, then abolished). In old orthography they were also used as in English, French and Dutch to separate diphthongs (e.g.: Raïnha, Luïsa, saüde and so on). The other way to separate diphthongs and non-hiatic vowel combinations is to use acute (as in modern saúde) or circumflex (as in old-style Corôa).

Stress
Below are the general rules for the use of the acute accent and the circumflex in Portuguese. Primary stress may fall on any of the three final syllables of a word. A word is called oxytone if it is stressed on its last syllable, paroxytone if stress falls on the syllable before the last (the penult), and proparoxytone if stress falls on the third syllable from the end (the antepenult). Most multisyllabic words are stressed on the penult.

All words stressed on the antepenult take an accent mark. Words with two or more syllables, stressed on their last syllable, are not accented if they have any ending other than -a(s), -e(s), -o(s), -am, -em, -ens; except to indicate hiatus as in açaí. With these endings paroxytonic words must then be accented to differentiate them from oxytonic words, as in amável, lápis, órgão.

Monosyllables
Monosyllables are typically not accented, but those whose last vowel is a, e, or o, possibly followed by final -s, -m or -ns, may require an accent mark.
 The verb pôr is accented to distinguish it from the preposition por.
 Third-person plural forms of the verbs ter and vir, têm and vêm are accented to be distinguished from third-person singulars of the same verbs, tem, vem. Other monosyllables ending in -em are not accented.
Otherwise, they are accented.
Most of those words have a masculine equivalent ending in -o(s), also not accented: o(s), do(s), lo(s), lho(s), mo(s), no(s), to(s).

Polysyllables
 The endings -a(s), -e(s), -o(s), -am, -em, -ens are unstressed. The stressed vowel of words with such endings is assumed to be the first one before the ending itself: bonita, bonitas, gente, viveram, seria, serias (verbs), seriam. If the word happens to be stressed elsewhere, it requires an accent mark: será, serás, até, séria, sérias (adjectives), Inácio, Amazônia/Amazónia. The endings -em and -ens take the acute accent when stressed (contém, convéns), except in third-person plural forms of verbs derived from ter and vir, which take the circumflex (contêm, convêm). Words with other endings are regarded as oxytone by default: viver, jardim, vivi, bambu, pensais, pensei, pensou, pensão. They require an accent when they are stressed on a syllable other than their last: táxi, fácil, amáveis, râguebi.
 Rising diphthongs (which may also be pronounced as hiatuses) containing stressed i or stressed u are accented so they will not be pronounced as falling diphthongs. Exceptions are those whose stressed vowel forms a syllable with a letter other than s. Thus, raízes (syllabified as ra-í-zes), incluído (in-clu-í-do), and saíste (sa-ís-te) are accented, but raiz (ra-iz), sairmos (sa-ir-mos) and saiu (sa-iu) are not. (There are a few more exceptions, not discussed here.)
 The stressed diphthongs ei, eu, oi take an acute accent on the first vowel whenever it is low.
 Aside from those cases, there are a few more words that take an accent, usually to disambiguate frequent homographs such as pode (present tense of the verb poder, with ) and pôde (preterite of the same verb, with ). In European Portuguese, a distinction is made in the first person plural of verbs in -ar, between the present tense ending -amos  and the preterite -ámos . As these are pronounced identically in Brazilian Portuguese, this accent is not used.

Accentuation rules of Portuguese are somewhat different regarding syllabification than those of Spanish (English "continuous" is Portuguese contínuo, Spanish continuo, and English "I continue" is Portuguese continuo, Spanish continúo, in both cases with the same syllable accented in Portuguese and Spanish).

Personal names
The use of diacritics in personal names is generally restricted to the combinations above, often also by the applicable Portuguese spelling rules.

Portugal is more restrictive than Brazil in regard to given names. They must be Portuguese or adapted to the Portuguese orthography and sound and should also be easily discerned as either a masculine or feminine name by a Portuguese speaker. There are lists of previously accepted and refused names, and names that are both unusual and not included in the list of previously accepted names must be subject to consultation of the national director of registries. The list of previously accepted names does not include some of the most common names, like "Pedro" (Peter) or "Ana" (Anne).
Brazilian birth registrars, on the other hand, are likely to accept names containing any (Latin) letters or diacritics and are limited only to the availability of such characters in their typesetting facility.

Consonants with more than one spelling

Velar plosives

Rhotics
The alveolar tap  is always spelled as a single r.

Notes

Sibilants
For the following phonemes, the phrase "at the start of a syllable" can be understood as "at the start of a word, or between a consonant and a vowel, in that order".

Note that there are two main groups of accents in Portuguese, one in which the sibilants are alveolar at the end of syllables ( or ), and another in which they are postalveolar ( or ). In this position, the sibilants occur in complementary distribution, voiced before voiced consonants, and voiceless before voiceless consonants or at the end of utterances.

Vowels
In unstressed syllables, each element of the pair occurs in complementary distribution with the other. Stressed  appears mostly before the nasal consonants m, n, nh, followed by a vowel, and stressed  appears mostly elsewhere although they have a limited number of minimal pairs in EP.

In Brazilian Portuguese, both nasal and unstressed vowel phonemes that only contrast when stressed tend to a mid height though  may be often heard in unstressed position (especially when singing or speaking emphatically). Some dialects, such as those of Northeastern and Southern Brazil, tend to do less pre-vocalic vowel reduction and in general the unstressed vowel sounds adhere to that of one of the stressed vowel pair, namely  and  respectively.—The influence of foreign accents on Italian language acquisition

In educated speech, vowel reduction is used less often than in colloquial and vernacular speech though still more than the more distant dialects, and in general, mid vowels are dominant over close-mid ones and especially open-mid ones in unstressed environments when those are in free variation (that is, sozinho is always , even in Portugal, while elogio is almost certainly ). Mid vowels are also used as choice for stressed nasal vowels in both Portugal and Rio de Janeiro though not in São Paulo and southern Brazil, but in Bahia, Sergipe and neighboring areas, mid nasal vowels supposedly are close-mid like those of French.

Vowel reduction of unstressed nasal vowels is extremely pervasive nationwide in Brazil, in vernacular, colloquial and even most educated speech registers. It is slightly more resisted but still present in Portugal.

Diacritics
The pronunciation of the accented vowels is fairly stable except that they become nasal in certain conditions. See #Nasalization for further information about this regular phenomenon. In other cases, nasal vowels are marked with a tilde.

The grave accent is used only on the letter a and is merely grammatical, meaning a crasis between two a such as the preposition "to" and the feminine article "the" (vou a cidade → vou à cidade "I'm going to the city"). In dialects where unstressed a is pronounced , à is pronounced ; in dialects where unstressed a is  the grave accent makes no difference in pronunciation.

There was a proposal to use the grave for separation of unstressed diphthongs, e.g.: saìmento, paìsagem, saùdar.

The trema was official prior to the last orthographical reform and can still be found in older texts. It meant that the usually silent u between q or g and i or e is in fact pronounced: líqüido “liquid” and sangüíneo “related to blood”. Some words have two acceptable pronunciations, varying largely by accents.

It was also proposed to use the grave accent instead of trema, e.g.: líqùido, sangùíneo.

{| class="wikitable"
! Grapheme
! Pronunciation
|- align=center
|  á
| 
|- align="center"
| é
| 
|- align="center"
| í
| 
|- align="center"
| ó
| 
|- align="center"
| ú
| 
|- align=center
| â
| , 
|- align="center"
| ê
| , 
|- align="center"
| ô
| 
|- align=center
| ã
| 
|- align=center
| õ
| 
|- align="center"
| à
|
|- align="center"
| è
|
|- align="center"
| ì
|
|- align="center"
| ò
|
|- align="center"
| ù
|
|- align=center
|}

Diphthongs
The pronunciation of each diphthong is also fairly predictable, but one must know how to distinguish true diphthongs from adjacent vowels in hiatus, which belong to separate syllables. For example, in the word saio , the i forms a clearer diphthong with the previous vowel (but  a slight yod also in the next syllable is generally present), but in saiu , it forms a diphthong with the next vowel. As in Spanish, a hiatus may be indicated with an acute accent, distinguishing homographs such as saia  and saía .

{| class="wikitable"
! colspan=4 | Oral
|-
! Grapheme
! Pronunciation
! Grapheme
! Pronunciation
|-
| align=center | ai || 
| align=center | au || 
|-
| align=center | ai, ái || 
| align=center | au, áu || 
|-
| align=center | ei, êi || , 
| align=center | eu, êu || 
|-
| align="center" | oi || 
| align="center" | ou || 
|-
| align=center | ei, éi || , 
| align=center | eu, éu || 
|-
| align=center | oi, ói || 
| align=center | ||
|-
|
|
| align=center | iu
|
|-
| align="center" | ui || 
|
|
|-
! colspan=4 | Nasal
|-
! Grapheme
! Pronunciation
! Grapheme
! Pronunciation
|-
| align=center | ãe, ãi || 
| align=center | ão || 
|-
| align=center | õe || 
| style="text-align:center;" colspan="2"| -
|}

Nasalization

When a syllable ends with m or n,  the consonant is not fully pronounced but merely indicates the nasalization of the vowel which precedes it. At the end of words, it generally produces a nasal diphthong.

{| class="wikitable"
! colspan=2 | Monophthongs
! colspan="3" | Diphthongs
|-
! Grapheme
! Pronunciation
! colspan="2" | Grapheme
! Pronunciation
|-
| -un, -um, -ún, -úm
|
| colspan="3" rowspan="2" |
|-
| -on, -om, -ôn, -ôm
|
|-
| -an, -am, -ân, -âm
|
| colspan="2" | -am
| 
|-
| rowspan="2"| -en, -em, -ên, -êm
| rowspan="2" | 
|| -em, -êm
| -en-
| rowspan="2" | 
|-
| -ém
| -én-
|-
| -in, -im, -ín, -ím
|
| colspan="3"|
|}

The letter m is conventionally written before b or p or at the end of words (also in a few compound words such as comummente - comumente in Brazil), and n is written before other consonants. In the plural, the ending -m changes into -ns; for example bem, rim, bom, um → bens, rins, bons, uns. Some loaned words end with -n (which is usually pronounced in European Portuguese).

Nasalization of ui, according to modern orthography, is left unmarked in the six words muito, muita, muitos, muitas, mui, ruim (the latter one only in Brazilian Portuguese). During some periods, the nasal ui was marked as ũi: mũi, mũita, mũito, mũitas, mũitos.

The word endings -am, -em, -en(+s), with or without an accent mark on the vowel, represent nasal diphthongs derived from various Latin endings, often -ant, -unt or -en(t)-. Final -am, which appears in polysyllabic verbs, is always unstressed. The grapheme -en- is also pronounced as a nasal diphthong in a few compound words, such as bendito (bem + dito), homenzinho (homem + zinho), and Benfica.

Morphological considerations
Verbs whose infinitive ends in -jar have j in the whole conjugation: viagem "voyage" (noun) but viajem (third person plural of the present subjunctive of the verb viajar "to travel").

Verbs whose thematic vowel becomes a stressed i in one of their inflections are spelled with an i in the whole conjugation, as are other words of the same family: crio (I create) implies criar (to create) and criatura (creature).

Verbs whose thematic vowel becomes a stressed ei in one of their inflections are spelled with an e in the whole conjugation, as are other words of the same family: nomeio (I nominate) implies nomear (to nominate) and nomeação (nomination).

Etymological considerations

The majority of the Portuguese lexicon is derived from Latin, Celtic, Greek, some Germanic and some Arabic. In principle, that would require some knowledge of those languages. However, Greek words are Latinized before being incorporated into the language, and many words of Latin or Greek origin have easily recognizable cognates in English and other western European languages and are spelled according to similar principles. For instance, glória, "glory", glorioso, "glorious", herança "inheritance", real "real/royal". Some general guidelines for spelling are given below:

 CU vs. QU: if u is pronounced syllabically, it is written with c, as in cueca  (male underwear), and if it represents a labialized velar plosive, it is written with q, as in quando  (when).
  G vs. J: etymological g, if representing a  phoneme, changes into j before a, o, u.
 H: this letter is silent; it appears for etymology at the start of a word, in a few interjections, and as part of the digraphs ch, lh, nh. Latin or Greek ch, ph, rh, th, and y are usually converted into c/qu, f, r, t, and i, respectively.
 O vs. OU: in many words, the variant ou normally corresponds to Latin and Arabic au or al, more rarely to Latin ap, oc.
 S/SS vs. C/Ç: the letter s and the digraph ss correspond to Latin s, ss, or ns, and to Spanish s. The graphemes c (before e or i) and ç (before a, o, u) are usually derived from Latin c or t(i), or from s in non-European languages, such as Arabic and Amerindian languages. They often correspond to Spanish z in any position or c preceding i or e. At the beginning of words, however, s is written instead of etymological ç, by convention.
 Z vs. S between vowels: the letter z corresponds to Latin c (+e, i) or t(i), to Greek or Arabic z. Intervocalic s corresponds to Latin s.
 X vs. CH: the letter x derives from Latin x or s, or from Arabic sh and usually corresponds to Spanish j. The digraph ch (before vowels) derives from Latin cl, fl, pl or from French ch and corresponds to Spanish ll (like in Rioplatense Spanish) or ch (like some varieties of Spanish).
 S vs. X vs. Z at the end of syllables: s is the most common spelling for all sibilants. The letter x appears, preceded by e and followed by one of the voiceless consonants c, p, s, t, in some words derived from Latin or Greek. The letter z occurs only at the end of oxytone words and in compounds derived from them, corresponding to Latin x, c (+e, i) or to Arabic z.

While the pronunciations of ch and x merged long ago, some Galician-Portuguese dialects like the Galician language, the portunhol da pampa and the speech registers of northeastern Portugal still preserve the difference as ch  vs. x , as do other Iberian languages and Medieval Portuguese. When one wants to stress the sound difference in dialects in which it merged the convention is to use tch: tchau (ciao) and Brazilian Portuguese República Tcheca (Czech Republic).

Syllabification and collation
Portuguese syllabification rules require a syllable break between double letters: cc, cç, mm, nn, rr, ss, or other combinations of letters that may be pronounced as a single sound: fric-ci-o-nar, pro-ces-so, car-ro, ex-ce(p)-to, ex-su-dar. Only the digraphs ch, lh, nh, gu, qu, and ou are indivisible. All digraphs are however broken down into their constituent letters for the purposes of collation, spelling aloud, and in crossword puzzles.

Other symbols

Apostrophe
The apostrophe (') appears as part of certain phrases, usually to indicate the elision of a vowel in the contraction of a preposition with the word that follows it: de + água = d'água. It is used almost exclusively in poetry.

Hyphen
The hyphen (-) is used to make compound words, especially plants and animal names like papagaio-de-rabo-vermelho "red-tailed parrot".

It is also extensively used to append clitic pronouns to the verb, as in quero-o "I want it" (enclisis), or even to embed them within the verb (mesoclisis), as in levaria + vos + os = levar-vo-los-ia "I would take them to you". Proclitic pronouns are not connected graphically to the verb: não o quero "I do not want it". Each element in such compounds is treated as an individual word for accentuation purposes: matarias + o = matá-lo-ias "You would kill it/him", beberá + a = bebê-la-á "He/she will drink it".

Quotation marks
In European Portuguese, as in many other European languages, angular quotation marks are used for general quotations in literature:

 «Isto é um exemplo de como fazer uma citação em português europeu.»
 “This is an example of how to make a quotation in European Portuguese.”

Although American-style (“…”) or British-style (‘…’) quotation marks are sometimes used as well, especially in less formal types of writing (they are more easily produced in keyboards) or inside nested quotations, they are less common in careful writing. In Brazilian Portuguese, only American and British-style quote marks are used.

 “Isto é um exemplo de como fazer uma citação em português brasileiro.”
 “This is an example of how to make a quotation in Brazilian Portuguese.”

In both varieties of the language, dashes are normally used for direct speech rather than quotation marks:

 
 
 “I’m so bored,” she said.
 “That’s not my fault,” he shot back.

Brazilian vs. European spelling

Prior to the Portuguese Language Orthographic Agreement of 1990, Portuguese had two orthographic standards:
 The Brazilian orthography, official in Brazil.
 The European orthography, official in Portugal, Macau, East Timor and the five African Lusophone countries (Angola, Mozambique, Guinea-Bissau, São Tomé and Príncipe, and Cape Verde).

The table to the right illustrates typical differences between the two orthographies. Some are due to different pronunciations, but others are merely graphic. The main ones are:

 Presence or absence of certain consonants: The letters c and p appear in some words before c, ç or t in one orthography, but are absent from the other. Normally, the letter is written down in the European spelling, but not in the Brazilian spelling.
 Different use of diacritics: the Brazilian spelling has a, ê or ô followed by m or n before a vowel, in several words where the European orthography has á, é or ó, due to different pronunciation.
 Different usage of double letters: also due to different pronunciation, Brazilian spelling has only cc, rr and ss as double letters. So, Portuguese connosco becomes Brazilian conosco and words ended in m with suffix -mente added, (like ruimmente and comummente) become ruimente and comumente in Brazilian spelling.

As of 2016, the reformed orthography (1990 Agreement) is obligatory in Brazil, Cape Verde, and Portugal.

See also
Academia Brasileira de Letras
Differences between Spanish and Portuguese
Portuguese names
Portuguese phonology
Spelling reforms of Portuguese
The Vietnamese orthography, partly based on the orthography of Portuguese, through the work of 16th-century Catholic missionaries.
Acordo Ortográfico de 1990
Wikipedia in Portuguese: Ortografia da língua portuguesa
Help:IPA/Portuguese

Notes

Citations

References
Bergström, Magnus & Reis, Neves Prontuário Ortográfico Editorial Notícias, 2004.
Estrela, Edite A questão ortográfica — Reforma e acordos da língua portuguesa (1993) Editorial Notícias
Formulário Ortográfico (Orthographic Form) published by the Brazilian Academy of Letters in 1943 - the pre-2009 spelling rules in Brazil
Text of the decree of the Brazilian government, in 1971, amending the orthography adopted in 1943
Orthographic Agreement of 1945 (in Portuguese) - the present day spelling rules in all Portuguese speaking countries except Portugal, Brazil, and Cabo Verde
Orthographic Agreement of 1990 (PDF - in Portuguese) - the present day spelling rules in Portugal, Brazil, and Cabo Verde, to be adopted by other Portuguese-speaking countries

External links
Omniglot's page on Portuguese Includes a recording with the names of the letters of the alphabet, and most phonemes, by a Brazilian speaker.
The pronunciation of the Portuguese of Portugal
Online Keyboard for Portuguese
Portuguese alphabet. Printable color and outline Portuguese letters.

Orthography, Portuguese
Indo-European Latin-script orthographies